Beyond The Dream (幻愛) is a 2019 Hong Kong romantic drama film directed by Kiwi Chow and written by Felix Tsang, starring Cecilia Choi and Terrance Lau. The film is based on the award-winning short film Upstairs (2006), which was also directed by Chow.  Beyond The Dream enjoyed box office success in Hong Kong, and the film also became the highest-grossing domestic film in Hong Kong in 2020 since the COVID-19 pandemic. The film also won the Best Adapted Screenplay award at 57th Golden Horse Awards, which is Taiwan's equivalent to the Academy Awards.

Plot
Lok, a kind-hearted and forthright primary school teacher, which was being treated to recovery from Psychosis. He never dare to fall in love although he was longed for a burning love, he also had an imaginary girlfriend, Yan. The girl fill his heart to full and he also knew it was all just his hallucinations.

One day, Lok met a beautiful and refined young girl Yip-Lam by chance, who looks exactly like Yan, and he fell in love with her at first sight. Another day, Lok was attend to a support group for Psychosis patients, and he met Yip-Lam again as a psychological counselor. They fell in love after getting to know each other deeply. The two developed a forbidden love with suspense and twists, which seemed to be true.

Unfortunately, Lok was haunted by his hallucinations and being sick again while hesitating, and he also discovered that she had utilize him for the sake of her programme. However, Yip-Lam also had her own unpleasant past experiences... Can the two overcome their difficulties? However, the forbidden love was exposed and forced them to separate. Can the two overcome the difficulties again?

Cast 
 Cecilia Choi as Yan / Yip Lam
 Terrance Lau as Lee Chi Lok
 Nina Paw as Dr. Fung, the mentor of Yip Lam.
 Chan-Leung Poon as Simon

Production

Script 
The script of this film can be traced back to 2006. Director Kiwi Chow returned to school as a part-time lecturer two years after he was graduated from Hong Kong Academy for Performing Arts. At that time, a student talked about the story of filming the story of psychiatric patients, which inspired him to start information gathering, and found that it was very difficult for them to fall in love, so it made him to create a 30-minute short film, named "Upstairs". The short film was well received and won several local and international film festival awards, including the Special Award for Young Film Art at the 2nd Student Television Festival which held in Warsaw, Poland, the Grand Prize of the 2006 Kodak Cinematography Competition (Hong Kong Region), the Silver Award of 2006 Hong Kong Independent Short Film and Video Competition (Open Category). The impressive achievements encouraged him to extend the story into a feature film, Beyond the Dream. However, it was unfortunately it had not been favored by investors, and the result is nothing. A few years before the film started, the director co-founded "Lightseed Films" with Felix Tsang, another producer and screenwriter. They cooperated to complete several scripts. Chow suddenly hooked the movie that have been shelved for years since they're failed to find funds to start filming. They made further revisions to "Beyond the Dream" and later obtained government funding successfully.

Funding 
"Beyond the Dream" was received HK $1.2 million through the Film Development Fund, which accounting for 20% of the total cost. The director had directed a film with sensitive theme, Ten Years, and some investors have indicated that they would not invest in his film, which made him to face difficulties in raising funds. The film was released on the big screen because of some benefactor had donated generously as they don't want to witness the decline of Hong Kong-produced films.

Casting 
The director Chow found that Terrance Lau performed in a different way within the audition, he's presents a Psychosis patient who seemed to be no different from the normal person, which coincides with his message. As for the heroine, because of someone had introduced her to the director, and the director had seen her performance at "My Very Short Marriage" and thought that she was very refreshing. She plays a professional role in the TV series, which is quite similar to the setting of this movie. In addition, combined with her looks like a highly educated person and her natural performance in audition, those various factors made her the best choice for the heroine.

Filming 
Most of the scenes in this film were filmed at Tuen Mun, Hong Kong. however it was not arranged by the director deliberately. When he discussed with the screenwriter about the character and background of the male protagonist, Chow believed that he was a character with low self-esteem, introverted, and avoids crowds, which was not suitable for living in the city center, but in a more remote location, so it made Tuen Mun as one of the options.

Music 
The music was done by Tu Du-Chih.

Release 
"Beyond the Dream" was released in Hong Kong on 2 July 2020, by Golden Scene Films. On the opening day, the box office was bleak for $140,000 Hong Kong dollars only. Fortunately, the box office rose sharply with the urgent support of the actors Chapman To, Kristal Tin, Harriet Yeung, director Wong Ho Yin and the yellow economic circle, and with many film critics were praised the film also, the box office as high as HK$750,000 on 4 July, and HK$900,000 on 5 July, becoming the single-day box office championship for two consecutive days. The box office has accumulated to about 2.4 million Hong Kong dollars within the 4 days of opening. By 9 July, the accumulated box office exceeded 4 million Hong Kong dollars, became the box office champion of the week. The 5 main creators of the movie went to multiple theaters in person for thank the tickets, more than 100 people had lined up for a photo with the main creator in each theater. As of 13 July, the box office has exceeded 8 million Hong Kong dollars. "Beyond the Dream" had reached HK$15.25 million at the Hong Kong box office finally, became one of the top ten movies with the highest Hong Kong box office in 2020.

The DVD/Blu-ray disc of the movie was released in Hong Kong on 3 December 2020, and according to the Hong Kong Record Merchants Association, "Beyond the Dream" had once topped the weekly DVD sales chart.

Director Chow pointed out that "Beyond the Dream" was to be able to make profits by relying on the local market of Hong Kong alone, which is a very rare case for Hong Kong movies in recent years.

The movie in Taiwan box office received NT$943,000.

Accolades

Influence

Set a trend of Tuen Mun fever 

The background was set in Tuen Mun, and the filming locations were considered to be very romantic, which like thee Japanese style painting, and attracting the audiences to revisit the filming scenes in groups.

Reinvigorating Hong Kong-produced films 
Affected by the COVID-19 epidemic, there is a shortage of international blockbusters during June and July, and the release of "Beyond the Dream" made Hong Kong-produced films to fill this window period indirectly. "My Prince Edward" and "Suk Suk" were officially released subsequently, the media collectively referred to the above three films as "3 Treasures of Golden Scene". The "3 Treasures of Golden Scene" not only have their own characteristics, but also arouse different audiences' re-attention to Hong Kong-produced films. It can be regarded as an Indian summer for the Hong Kong films. Those three films were very popular among Hong Kong people, and a variety of peripheral products, such as postcards, novels, theme coffee, etc. were launched rarely in Hong Kong film history.

The romance of the leads 
The male and female protagonists had known each other before filming, but they were not familiar with each other. They gradually fell in love with each other during the filming and became a real couple. In the interview, the male lead expressed that there had a scene was filmed at a light rail station, the emotions he released were very surging and intense which made him exhausted, but he felt that the encouragement by the female protagonist constantly, so made him love.

The derivative work by the bus company 
Kowloon Motor Bus had uploaded a derivative poster on its Facebook page, which was of derivative from the film, the promotional phrase of the poster was "I don't mind—don't you?". The title was "Sit Down", urging passengers to remember to sit still while the bus was moving, and hold the handrail tightly while standing, and wear a mask most importantly to avoid fines. The poster was warmly welcomed by netizens.

References

External links
Beyond The Dream - Asian Pop-Up Cinema

2019 films
2019 romantic drama films
2010s Cantonese-language films
Films set in Hong Kong
Hong Kong nonlinear narrative films
Hong Kong romantic drama films
2010s Hong Kong films